Ebro trucks was a Spanish brand of light and medium trucks and buses, as well as all-wheel-drive utility vehicles with plants located in Barcelona, Madrid, Ávila, and Cordoba.

History
Ebro trucks's parent company, Motor Ibérica, was set up in 1954 to build original British-designed Ford trucks based on Ford's Thames Trader ET4 4X2 and ET6 6X4 models under license using the name EBRO during the 1950s and 1960s.

1960s−1970s
It also took over the Spanish branch of Perkins engines.

This resulted in a real frenzy of badge engineering, as one could see Avia-badged Jeeps, Ebro-badged Alfa-Romeos, and so on. Meanwhile, Ebro introduced tilt-cab Ford 'D'-Series derived models for loads of between l'/2 and 7 tons and gradually added new models until the range covered 2- and 3-axle rigids and articulated types from 3 to 27 tons capacity.

Ebro also entered the agricultural tractor market through a license agreement with Massey Ferguson, which eventually led to the later becoming the controlling shareholder in Motor Ibérica.

1980s
In the 1980s, Ebro launched the 'E'-Series trucks range, comprising some six models from 3,500 to 11,200 kg gross, and the 'P'-Series for gross  weights of 13,000 to 27,000 kg. The lighter Avia range also continued in production.

In 1979 Nissan Motors (not Nissan Diesel, the truck subsidiary) had taken a 34% stake in Motor Ibérica, which by the autumn of 1982 had increased to 53% . 

Nissan then took complete control in 1987, following Spain's accession to the EEC. From then on the company was named Nissan Motor Ibérica. During a short period, Japanese Kubota tractors were assembled and marketed in Spain as Ebro-Kubota.

Following the Nissan takeover, a "badge slide" from Ebro to Nissan took place. This was not without surprising occurrences, such as Ebro-badged Nissan Patrols that were sold in some European countries. During the 1980s and 1990s EBRO produced the EBRO NISSAN Vanette panel vans and the EBRO NISSAN PATROL 4X4 Series, although today the name EBRO has been dropped vehicles are still produced under the name NISSAN ATLEON and NISSAN CABSTAR commercial range.

2010s
Currently, Spanish Nissan are manufacturing the Cabstar light truck range and the Atleon heavy trucks range at their NISSAN MOTORS Avila plant.

Gallery

References

External links
Spanish Nissan trucks webpage
Webpage on the Ebro Comando — Spanish clone of the more-famous American Jeep Commando.

Defunct motor vehicle manufacturers of Spain
Defunct truck manufacturers
Nissan
Companies based in Barcelona
Companies based in Madrid
Companies of Andalusia
Vehicle manufacturing companies established in 1954
1980s disestablishments in Spain
Spanish brands
Spanish companies established in 1954
Manufacturing companies of Spain
Vehicle manufacturers of Spain